Darwin is the capital city of the Northern Territory, Australia. With an estimated population of 147,255 as of 2019, the city contains the majority of the residents of the sparsely populated Northern Territory.

It is the smallest, wettest, and most northerly of the Australian capital cities and serves as the Top End's regional centre.

Darwin's proximity to Southeast Asia makes the city's location a key link between Australia and countries such as Indonesia and East Timor. The Stuart Highway begins in Darwin, extends southerly across central Australia through Tennant Creek and Alice Springs, concluding in Port Augusta, South Australia. The city is built upon a low bluff overlooking Darwin Harbour. Darwin's suburbs begin at Lee Point in the north and stretch to Berrimah in the east. The Stuart Highway extends to Darwin's eastern satellite city of Palmerston and its suburbs.

The Darwin region, like much of the Top End, experiences a tropical climate with a wet and dry season. A period known locally as "the build up" leading up to Darwin's wet season sees temperature and humidity increase. Darwin's wet season typically arrives in late November to early December and brings with it heavy monsoonal downpours, spectacular lightning displays, and increased cyclone activity. During the dry season, the city has clear skies and mild sea breezes from the harbour.

The Larrakia people are the traditional owners of the Darwin area and Aboriginal people make up a significant percentage of the population. On 9 September 1839,  sailed into Darwin Harbour during its survey of the area. John Clements Wickham named the region "Port Darwin" in honour of their former shipmate Charles Darwin, who had sailed with them on the ship's previous voyage. The settlement there became the town of Palmerston in 1869, but it was renamed Darwin in 1911. The city has been almost entirely rebuilt four times, following devastation caused by a cyclone in 1897, another one in 1937, Japanese air raids during World War II, and Cyclone Tracy in 1974.

History

Pre-20th century
The Aboriginal people of the Larrakia language group are the traditional custodians and earliest known inhabitants of the greater Darwin area. Their name for the area is Garramilla, pronounced  and meaning "white stone", referring to the colour of rock found in the area. They had trading routes with Southeast Asia (see Macassan contact with Australia) and imported goods from as far afield as South and Western Australia. Established songlines penetrated throughout the country, allowing stories and histories to be told and retold along the routes. The extent of shared songlines and history of multiple clan groups within this area is contestable.

The Dutch visited Australia's northern coastline in the 1600s and landed on the Tiwi Islands only to be repelled by the Tiwi peoples. The Dutch created the first European maps of the area. This accounts for the Dutch names in the area, such as Arnhem Land and Groote Eylandt. During this period, Dutch explorers named the region around Darwin—sometimes inclusive of nearby Kimberley—variations of Van Diemen's Land after the VOC governor-general Anthony van Diemen. This should not be confused with the more general and prolonged use of the same name for Tasmania.

The ship's captain, Commander John Clements Wickham, named the port after Charles Darwin, the British naturalist who had sailed with them both on the earlier second expedition of the Beagle.

In 1863, the Northern Territory was transferred from New South Wales to South Australia. In 1864 South Australia sent B. T. Finniss north as Government Resident to survey and found a capital for its new territory. This attempt was short-lived, however, and the settlement abandoned by 1865. On 5 February 1869, George Goyder, the Surveyor-General of South Australia, established a small settlement of 135 people at Port Darwin between Fort Hill and the escarpment. Goyder named the settlement Palmerston after the British Prime Minister Lord Palmerston. In 1870, the first poles for the Overland Telegraph were erected in Darwin, connecting Australia to the rest of the world. The discovery of gold by employees of the Australian Overland Telegraph Line digging holes for telegraph poles at Pine Creek in the 1880s spawned a gold rush, which further boosted the young colony's development.

In February 1872 the brigantine Alexandra was the first private vessel to sail from an English port directly to Darwin, carrying people many of whom were coming to recent gold finds.

In early 1875 Darwin's white population had grown to approximately 300 because of the gold rush. On 17 February 1875 the  left Darwin en route for Adelaide. The approximately 88 passengers and 34 crew (surviving records vary) included government officials, circuit-court judges, Darwin residents taking their first furlough, and miners. While travelling south along the north Queensland coast, the Gothenburg encountered a cyclone-strength storm and was wrecked on a section of the Great Barrier Reef. Only 22 men survived, while between 98 and 112 people perished. Many passengers who perished were Darwin residents and news of the tragedy severely affected the small community, which reportedly took several years to recover.

In the 1870s, relatively large numbers of Chinese settled at least temporarily in the Northern Territory; many were contracted to work the goldfields and later to build the Palmerston to Pine Creek railway. By 1888 there were 6122 Chinese in the Northern Territory, mostly in or around Darwin. The early Chinese settlers were mainly from Guangdong Province in south China. However, at the end of the nineteenth century anti-Chinese feelings grew in response to the 1890s economic depression, and the White Australia policy meant many Chinese left the territory. However, some families stayed, became British subjects, and established a commercial base in Darwin.

Early 20th century

The Northern Territory was initially settled and administered by South Australia, until its transfer to the Commonwealth in 1911. In the same year, the city's official name changed from Palmerston to Darwin.

The period between 1911 and 1919 was filled with political turmoil, particularly with trade union unrest, which culminated on 17 December 1918. Led by Harold Nelson, some 1,000 demonstrators marched to Government House at Liberty Square in Darwin where they burnt an effigy of the Administrator of the Northern Territory John Gilruth and demanded his resignation. The incident became known as the Darwin Rebellion. Their grievances were against the two main Northern Territory employers: Vestey's Meatworks and the federal government. Both Gilruth and the Vestey company left Darwin soon afterwards.

On 18 October 1918, during the Spanish flu pandemic, the SS Mataram sailing from Singapore with infectious diseases arrived in Darwin.

In 1931, the 17 remaining patients from the leprosarium at Cossack, Western Australia were moved to Darwin, after it closed down. It was at a time when many Aboriginal people who were thought to have leprosy or other infectious diseases were sent to lock hospitals and leprosariums under the Aborigines Act 1905, which gave the Chief Protector of Aborigines powers to arrest and send any Indigenous person suspected of having a range of diseases to one of these institutions.

Around 10,000 Australian and other Allied troops arrived in Darwin at the outset of World War II, to defend Australia's northern coastline. On 19 February 1942 at 0957, 188 Japanese warplanes attacked Darwin in two waves. It was the same fleet that had bombed Pearl Harbor, though a considerably larger number of bombs were dropped on Darwin than on Pearl Harbor. The attack killed at least 243 people and caused immense damage to the town, airfields, and aircraft. These were by far the most serious attacks on Australia in time of war, in terms of fatalities and damage. They were the first of many raids on Darwin.

Darwin was further developed after the war, with sealed roads constructed connecting the region to Alice Springs to the south and Mount Isa to the south-east, and Manton Dam built in the south to provide the city with water. On Australia Day (26 January) 1959, Darwin was granted city status.

1970–present day

On 25 December 1974, Darwin was struck by Cyclone Tracy, which killed 71 people and destroyed over 70% of the city's buildings, including many old stone buildings such as the Palmerston Town Hall, which could not withstand the lateral forces generated by the strong winds. After the disaster, 30,000 people of the population of 46,000 were evacuated, in what turned out to be the biggest airlift in Australia's history. The town was subsequently rebuilt with newer materials and techniques during the late 1970s by the Darwin Reconstruction Commission, led by former Brisbane Lord mayor Clem Jones.

On 17 September 2003 the Adelaide–Darwin railway was completed, with the opening of the Alice Springs–Darwin standard gauge line.

Aviation history 

Darwin has played host to many of aviation's early pioneers. On 10 December 1919 Captain Ross Smith and his crew landed in Darwin and won a £10,000 Prize from the Australian Government for completing the first flight from London to Australia in under thirty days. Smith and his Crew flew a Vickers Vimy, G-EAOU, and landed on an airstrip that has now become Ross Smith Avenue.

Other aviation pioneers include Amy Johnson, Amelia Earhart, Sir Charles Kingsford Smith and Bert Hinkler. The original QANTAS Empire Airways Ltd Hangar, a registered heritage site, was part of the original Darwin Civil Aerodrome in Parap and is now a museum and still bears scars from the bombing of Darwin during World War II.

Darwin was home to Australian and US pilots during the war, with airstrips built in and around Darwin. Today Darwin provides a staging ground for military exercises.

Darwin was a compulsory stopover and checkpoint in the London-to-Melbourne Centenary Air Race in 1934. The official name of the race was the MacRobertson Air Race. Winners of the race were Tom Campbell Black and C. W. A. Scott.

The following is an excerpt from Time magazine, 29 October 1934:

Geography 
Darwin is a coastal city, situated along the western shoreline of the Northern Territory. The water meets the land from the Beagle Gulf, which extends out into the Timor Sea. The central business district occupies a low bluff overlooking Darwin Harbour to the south, beyond which lie East Arm, Middle Arm, and, across the gulf, West Arm. Middle Arm has an industrial precinct on the peninsula, which is being promoted as a sustainable development area which will include plants for industries such as low-emission petrochemicals, renewable hydrogen, and carbon capture storage. The city is flanked by Frances Bay to the east, and Cullen Bay to the west.

The remainder of the city is relatively flat and low-lying, and areas bordering the coast are home to recreational reserves, extensive beaches, and excellent fishing.

City and suburbs 

Darwin and its suburbs spread in an approximately triangular shape, with the older south-western suburbs—and the city itself—forming one corner, the newer northern suburbs another, and the eastern suburbs, progressing towards Palmerston, forming the third.

The older part of Darwin is separated from the newer northern suburbs by Darwin International Airport and RAAF Base Darwin. The rural areas of Darwin including Howard Springs, Humpty Doo and Berry Springs are experiencing strong growth.

Darwin's central business district (CBD) is bounded by Daly Street in the north-west, McMinn Street in the north-east, Mitchell Street on the south-west, and Bennett Street on the south-east. The developers announced that this includes hotels, residential apartments, and public space. The city's main industrial areas are along the Stuart Highway going towards Palmerston, centred on Winnellie. The largest shopping precinct in the area is Casuarina Square.

The most expensive residential areas stand along the coast in suburbs such as the marina of Cullen Bay part of Larrakeyah, Bayview and Brinkin, despite the risk these low-lying regions face during cyclones and higher tides, adequate drainage and stringent building regulations have reduced the potential damage to buildings or injury to residents. The inner northern suburbs are home to lower-income households, although low-income Territory Housing units are scattered throughout the metropolitan area. The suburb of Lyons was part of a multi-stage land release and development in the Northern Suburbs; planning, development and construction took place from 2004 to 2009. More recent developments near Lyons subdivision includes the suburb of Muirhead.

Climate 

Darwin has a tropical savanna climate (Köppen Aw) with distinct wet and dry seasons and the average maximum temperature is similar all year round. The Australian Building Codes Board classifies it as Climate Zone 1 based on its very humid summers and warm winters. The dry season runs from about May to September, during which nearly every day is sunny, and afternoon relative humidity averages around 30%.

For a 147‑day period during the 2012 dry season, from 5 May to 29 September, Darwin recorded no precipitation whatsoever. Prolonged periods of no precipitation are common in the dry season in Northern Australia (particularly in the Northern Territory and northern regions of Western Australia), although a no-rainfall event of this extent is rare.

The wet season is associated with tropical cyclones and monsoon rains. The majority of rainfall occurs between December and March (the southern hemisphere summer), when thunderstorms are common and afternoon relative humidity averages over 70 percent during the wettest months. It does not rain every day during the wet season, but most days have plentiful cloud cover; January averages under 6 hours of bright sunshine daily. February 2011 was also Darwin's wettest month ever recorded, with  recorded for the month at the airport.

The hottest months are October and November, just before the onset of the main rain season. The heat index sometimes rises above , while the actual temperature is usually below , because of humidity levels that most would find uncomfortable. Because of its long dry season, Darwin has the second-highest average daily hours of sunshine (8.4) of any Australian capital, with the most sunshine from April to November; only Perth, Western Australia, averages more (8.8). The sun passes directly overhead in mid-October and mid-February.

Darwin occupies one of the most lightning-prone areas in Australia. On 31 January 2002 an early-morning squall line produced over 5,000 cloud-to-ground lightning strikes within a  radius of Darwin alone—about three times the amount of lightning that Perth, Western Australia, experiences on average in an entire year.

Demographics

Ancestry and immigration
Darwin's population changed after the Second World War. Darwin, like many other Australian cities, experienced influxes from Europe, with significant numbers of Italians and Greeks during the 1960s and 1970s. Darwin also started to experience an influx from other European countries, which included the Dutch, Germans, and many others. A significant percentage of Darwin's residents are recent immigrants from Asia, including the peoples of East Timor.

At the 2016 census, the most commonly nominated ancestries were: 

38.3% of the population at the 2016 census was born overseas. The five largest groups of overseas-born were from the Philippines (3.6%), England (3.1%), New Zealand (2.1%), India (2%) and Greece (0.9%).

8.7% of the population, or 11,960 people, identified as Indigenous Australians (Aboriginal Australians and/or Torres Strait Islanders) in 2016. This is the largest proportion of any Australian capital city.

Language
At the 2016 census, 58% of the population spoke only English at home. Other languages spoken at home include Tagalog (3.7%), Greek (3.5%), Mandarin (2.0%), Nepali (1.2%), Indonesian (1.0%), Australian Aboriginal languages (1.0%), Malayalam (0.9%), Vietnamese (0.8%), Cantonese (0.7%), Italian (0.6%), Portuguese (0.5%, mostly spoken by Timorese), and Tamil (0.5%).

Age
In 2011, the Darwin population averaged 33 years old (compared to the national average of around 37 years) assisted to a large extent by the military presence and the fact that many people opt to retire elsewhere.

Religion 
, Christianity had the most adherents in Darwin, with 56,613 followers accounting for 49.5 percent of the population of the city. The largest denominations of Christianity are Roman Catholicism (24,538 or 21.5 percent), Anglicanism (14,028 or 12.3 percent) and Greek Orthodoxy (2,964 or 2.6 percent). Buddhists, Muslims, Hindus and Jews account for 3.2 percent of Darwin's population. There were 26,695 or 23.3 percent of people professing no religion.

Law and government 

The Darwin City Council (incorporated under the Northern Territory Local Government Act 1993) governs the City of Darwin, which takes in the CBD and the suburbs. The city has been governed by a city council form of government since 1957. The council consists of 13 elected members, the lord mayor, and 12 aldermen.

The City of Darwin electorate is organised into four electoral units or wards. The wards are Chan, Lyons, Richardson, and Waters. The constituents of each ward are directly responsible for electing three aldermen. Constituents of all wards are directly responsible for electing the Lord Mayor of Darwin. The mayor is Kon Vatskalis after council elections in August 2017.

The rest of the Darwin area is divided into two local government areas—the Palmerston City Council and the Shire of Coomalie. These areas have elected councils that are responsible for functions delegated to them by the Northern Territory Government, such as planning and garbage collection.

The Legislative Assembly of the Northern Territory convenes in Darwin in the Northern Territory Parliament House. Government House, the official residence of the Administrator of the Northern Territory, is on the Esplanade.

Darwin is split between nine electoral divisions in the Legislative Assembly—Port Darwin, Fannie Bay, Fong Lim, Nightcliff, Sanderson, Johnston, Casuarina, Wanguri, and Karama. Historically, Darwin voters elected Country Liberal Party members. However, since the turn of the 21st century, voters have often selected Labor members, particularly in the more diverse northern section; as of the 2020 Northern Territory general election, all of Darwin's nine Legislative Assembly electoral divisions are held by Labor, with Labor also holding both the Northern Territory's federal electorates, Solomon and Lingiari.

Also on the Esplanade is the Supreme Court of the Northern Territory. Darwin has a Magistrate's Court which is on the corner of Cavenagh and Bennett streets, quite close to the Darwin City Council Chambers.

Crime 

Darwin's police force are members of the Northern Territory Police, under the NT Police Darwin Metropolitan Command. The Darwin urban centre includes Darwin City and the associated suburbs from Buffalo Creek, Berrimah, and East Arm westwards, representing around 35% of the Northern Territory's population. Palmerston urban centre closely approximates the Palmerston Local Government Area, and represents approximately 13% of the Northern Territory's population.

Darwin has had a history of alcohol abuse and violent crime, with 6,000 assaults in 2009, of which 350 resulted in broken jaws and noses—more than anywhere else in the world, according to the Royal Darwin Hospital.

Mitchell Street, with its numerous pubs, clubs and other entertainment venues, was one of the areas policed by the CitySafe Unit, officially launched by the NT Chief Minister Paul Henderson on 25 February 2009. It was credited with success in tackling alcohol abuse linked to crime, and the NT police were looking at establishing a specialist licensing enforcement unit in 2010.

The First Response Patrol, run by Larrakia Nation, which helps to move homeless Indigenous women out of dangerous situations, was credited with the fall in sexual assaults in 2009. The service operates every day from 5am to 2am.

Recent trends
In the 10 months between 1 October 2018, the date that the alcohol floor price and various other measures were imposed by the NT government following the Riley Review, and 31 July 2019, alcohol-related assaults dropped by 16% and domestic violence by 9% in the Darwin area.

The rate of offending in most categories of crime dropped in the Darwin urban area between 2018 and 2019, with the notable exceptions of motor vehicle theft and break-ins (both up about 12%). Apart from sexual assault, which rose from 21 to 46, all other categories of crime showed drops in Palmerston.

Economy 

The two largest economic sectors are mining and tourism. Given its location, Darwin serves as a gateway for Australian travellers to Asia.

Mining and energy industry production exceeds $2.5 billion per annum. The most important mineral resources are gold, zinc, and bauxite, along with manganese and many others. The energy production is mostly off-shore with oil and natural gas from the Timor Sea, although there are significant uranium deposits near Darwin. Tourism employs 8% of Darwin residents and is expected to grow as domestic and international tourists are now spending time in Darwin during the Wet and Dry seasons. Federal spending is also a major contributor to the local economy.

Darwin's importance as a port is expected to grow, due to the increased exploitation of petroleum in the nearby Timor Sea and to the completion of the railway link and continued expansion in trade with Asia. During 2005, a number of major construction projects started in Darwin. One is the redevelopment of the Wharf Precinct, which includes a large convention and exhibition centre, apartment housing including Outrigger Pandanas and Evolution on Gardiner, retail and entertainment outlets including a large wave pool and safe swimming lagoon. The Chinatown project has also started with plans to construct Chinese-themed retail and dining outlets.

Tourism 
Tourism is one of Darwin's largest industries and a major employment sector for the Northern Territory. In 2005–2006, 1.38 million people visited the Northern Territory. They stayed for 9.2 million nights and spent over $1.5 billion. The tourism industry directly employed 8,391 Territorians in June 2006, and, when indirect employment is included, tourism typically accounts for more than 14,000 jobs across the Territory.

Darwin is a hub for tours to Kakadu National Park, Litchfield National Park and Katherine Gorge. The Territory is traditionally divided into the wet and dry, but there are up to six traditional seasons in Darwin. It is warm and sunny from May to September. Humidity rises during the green season, from October to April bringing thunderstorms and monsoonal rains which rejuvenates the landscape. Tourism is largely seasonal with most tourists visiting during the cooler dry season which runs from April to September.

Military 

The military presence that is maintained both within Darwin, and the wider Northern Territory, is a substantial source of employment. On 16 November 2011, Prime Minister Julia Gillard and President Barack Obama announced that the United States would station troops in Australia for the first time since World War II. The agreement between the United States and Australia would involve a contingent of 250 Marines arriving in Darwin in 2012, with the total number rising to a maximum of 2,500 troops by 2017 on six-month rotations as well as a supporting air element including F-22 Raptors, F-35 Joint Strike Fighters and KC-135 refuellers. China and Indonesia have expressed concern about the decision. Some analysts have argued that an expanded U.S. presence could pose a threat to security.
Gillard announced that the first 200 U.S. Marines had arrived in Darwin from Hawaii on late 3 April 2012. In 2013, further news of other expansion vectors was aired in US media, with no comment or confirmation from Australian authorities. The agreement between the two governments remains hidden from public scrutiny. Marine numbers based in Darwin increased to more than 1,150 troops by 2014. In a 2019 telephone survey of local residents, 51% of respondents had positive feelings about the U.S. troop presence, with 6% responding negatively. In late 2021, the US Department of Defense signed a contract to create a  fuel storage facility at East Arm.

Darwin hosts biennial multi-nation exercises named "Pitch Black"; in 2014 this involved military personnel from Australia, New Zealand, Singapore, Thailand, United Arab Emirates, and the United States.

Education 

Education is overseen territory-wide by the Department of Education and Training (DET), whose role is to continually improve education outcomes for all students, with a focus on Indigenous students.

Preschool, primary and secondary 
Darwin is served by a number of public and private schools that cater to local and overseas students. Over 16,500 primary and secondary students are enrolled in schools in Darwin, with 10,524 students attending primary education, and 5,932 students attending secondary education. There are over 12,089 students enrolled in government schools and 2,124 students enrolled in independent schools.

There were 9,764 students attending schools in the City of Darwin area. 6,045 students attended primary schools and 3,719 students attended secondary schools. There are over 7,161 students enrolled in government schools and 1,108 students enrolled in independent schools. There are over 35 primary and pre–schools, and 12 secondary schools, including both government and non-government. Most schools in the city are secular, but there are a small number of Christian, Catholic and Lutheran institutions. Students intending to complete their secondary education work towards either the Northern Territory Certificate of Education, the Victorian Certificate of Education or the Victorian Certificate of Applied Learning (the latter two are only offered at Haileybury Rendall School). Prior to the sale and restructuring of Kormilda College in 2018, it was the only school to offer the International Baccalaureate in the Northern Territory.

Schools have been restructured into Primary, Middle, and High schools since the beginning of 2007.

Tertiary and vocational 
Darwin's largest university is the Charles Darwin University, which is the central provider of tertiary education in the Northern Territory. It covers both vocational and academic courses, acting as both a university and an Institute of TAFE. There are over 5,500 students enrolled in tertiary and further education courses.

Architecture 

As Darwin was destroyed by cyclones several times and suffered severe bomb damage during World War II, there are few historic buildings left in town. The Administrator's Office dating from 1883 was used as a law court and as a police station and was only slightly damaged by bombs. In 1974, however, it was completely destroyed by the cyclone. In 1979 it was decided to rebuild, and the reconstruction was finished in 1981. The building houses Government offices today. Opposite the building Survivors Lookout offers a view of the marina.

In a park in the south of the CBD, the ruin of the Town Hall that had been built in 1883 and destroyed by the cyclone in 1974 can be seen. Browns Mart is a stone building dating from 1880 opposite the park. Originally Browns Mart was the bourse of a mining company but later it was transformed into a theatre.

One of the most prominent buildings of Darwin is the Chinese Temple, which was founded in 1887 and damaged by cyclones in 1897 and in 1937. In 1942 it was severely damaged by bombs and rebuilt after the war. On 24 December 1974 it was completely destroyed by the cyclone. The reconstruction was completed in 1978.

There are various modern churches in Darwin. St Mary's Star of the Sea Roman Catholic Cathedral was inaugurated in 1962. Christ Church Anglican Cathedral was rebuilt in 1977 after it had been severely damaged by bombs in 1942 and destroyed by cyclone Tracy in 1974. The Uniting Memorial Church was built in 1960.

Events and festivals 

The annual Darwin Fringe Festival runs for 10 days each July as an open-access festival.
The Darwin Festival occurs each year in  August, which includes comedy, dance, theatre, music, film and visual art, and the NT Indigenous Music Awards.
The Nightcliff Seabreeze Festival, which first started in 2005, is held on the second week of May in the suburb of Nightcliff. It offers the opportunity for local talent to be showcased, and a popular event is Saturday family festivities along the Nightcliff foreshore, which is one of Darwin's most popular fitness tracks.
The Darwin beer-can regatta, held in August, celebrates Darwin's love affair with beer, and contestants race boats made exclusively of beer cans. Also in Darwin during the month of August are the Darwin Cup horse race and the rodeo and Mud Crab Tying Competition.
The World Solar Challenge race attracts teams from around the world, most of which are fielded by universities or corporations although some are fielded by high schools. The race has a 20-year history spanning nine races, with the inaugural event taking place in 1987.
The Royal Darwin Show is held annually in July at the Darwin Showgrounds. Exhibitions include agriculture and livestock, and horse events. Entertainment and sideshows are also included over the three days of the event.
The Darwin Street Art Festival is an annual event in September where street artists from around the world create large outdoor murals.
A yearly music festival, BASSINTHEGRASS, has been held since 2003. Since 2019 it has been held at Mindil Beach.
On 1 July, Territorians celebrate Territory Day. This is the only day of the year, apart from the Chinese New Year and New Year's Eve, that fireworks are permitted. In Darwin, the main celebrations occur at Mindil Beach, where a large firework display is commissioned by the government.
Other festivals include the Glenti, which showcases Darwin's large Greek community, and India@Mindil, a similar festival held by the city's Indian community. The Chinese New Year is also celebrated with great festivity, highlighting the East Asian influence in Darwin.

Arts and culture 

The Darwin Symphony Orchestra was first assembled in 1989 and has performed throughout the Territory. The Darwin Theatre Company is a locally produced professional theatre production company, performing locally and nationally.

The Darwin Entertainment Centre is the city's main concert venue and hosts theatre and orchestral performances. Other theatres include the Darwin Convention Centre, which opened in July 2008. The Darwin Convention Centre is part of the $1.1 billion Darwin Waterfront project.

The Northern Territory Museum and Art Gallery (MAGNT) in Darwin gives an overview of the history of the area, including exhibits on Cyclone Tracy and the boats of the Pacific Islands. The MAGNT also organises the annual Telstra National Aboriginal and Torres Strait Islander Art Award, the longest-running Indigenous art award in Australia. The MAGNT also manages the Defence of Darwin Experience, a multi-media installation that tells the story of the Japanese air raids on Darwin during World War II.

The NT Dance Company is  led by choreographer Gary Lang, who has been artistic director since 2012. Lang had previously taught at many leading dance companies, including Bangarra Dance Theatre, after studying dance at NAISDA in Sydney and working as a dancer for years. The company has a strong focus on culture, and also works with disadvantaged young Indigenous people.

Local and visiting bands can be heard at venues including the Darwin Entertainment Centre, The Vic Hotel, Happy Yess, and Brown's Mart. Artists such as Jessica Mauboy and The Groovesmiths call Darwin home.

Other entertainment

Weekly markets include the popular Mindil Beach Sunset Market (Thursdays and Sundays during the dry season); Parap Market; Nightcliff Market; and Rapid Creek market.

Darwin's only casino opened in 1979 as the Don Casino, operating out of the Don Hotel on Cavenagh Street. The present site of the hotel and casino on Darwin's Mindil Beach opened in 1983, at which point gambling operations ceased at the Don Hotel and commenced at the newly built facilities. The new hotel and casino was named Mindil Beach Casino until 1985, when the name changed to the Diamond Beach Hotel Casino. Upon the acquisition by MGM Grand the hotel was re-branded as the MGM Grand Darwin, before it changed to Skycity Darwin after Skycity Entertainment Group purchased the hotel in 2004.

Mitchell Street in the central business district is lined with nightclubs, takeaways, and restaurants. This is the city's entertainment hub. There are several smaller theatres, three cinema complexes (CBD, Casuarina, and Palmerston), and the Deckchair Cinema. This is an open-air cinema that operates through the dry season, from April to October, and screens independent and arthouse films.

Recreation

Beaches  

During the months of October–May the sea contains deadly box jellyfish, known locally as stingers or sea wasps. Saltwater crocodiles are common in all waterways surrounding Darwin and are occasionally found in Darwin Harbour and on local beaches. An active trapping program is carried out by the NT Government to limit numbers of crocodiles within the Darwin urban waterway area.

The city has many kilometres of beaches, including the Casuarina Beach and renowned Mindil Beach, home of the Mindil Beach markets. Darwin City Council has designated an area of Casuarina Beach as a free beach, which has been designated as a nudist beach area since 1976.

Bundilla Beach was formerly named Vesteys Beach, as it was one of the beaches overlooked by Vestey's Meatworks, which existed from 1914 to 1920 and which was involved in the Darwin rebellion. In March 2021, the beach was formally renamed Bundilla Beach, the name by which it had long been known to the traditional owners, the Larrakia people.

The Darwin Surf Life Saving Club operates longboats and surf skis and provides events and lifesaving accreditations.

Fishing
Fishing is a popular recreation among Darwin locals. Visitors fish for the barramundi, an iconic fish in the region. This fish thrives in the Mary River, Daly River, and South and East Alligator River.

Blue-water fishing is also available off the coast of Darwin; Spanish mackerel, black jewfish, queenfish, and snapper are found in the area. Lake Alexander is a man-made swimming lake at East Point Reserve.

Parks and gardens 
Darwin has extensive parks and gardens. These include the George Brown Darwin Botanic Gardens, East Point Reserve, Casuarina Coastal Reserve, Charles Darwin National Park, Knuckey Lagoons Conservation Reserve, Leanyer Recreation Park, the Nightcliff Foreshore, Bicentennial Park and the Jingili Water Gardens.

Sports 

The Marrara Sports Complex near the airport has stadiums for Australian rules (TIO Stadium), cricket, rugby league, football, basketball (and indoor court sports), athletics and field hockey. Every two years since 1991 (excluding 2003 due to the SARS outbreak), Darwin has hosted the Arafura Games, a major regional sporting event. In July 2003, the city hosted its first international test cricket match between Australia and Bangladesh, followed by Australia and Sri Lanka in 2004.

Australian rules is played all year round and the Territory's premier league competition, the Northern Territory Football League is based in Darwin. Australian Football League clubs generally sell a handful of games to the Northern Territory each year, some of which are played at Marrara Oval. Darwin is part of a bid for a Northern Territory AFL license for proposed entry into the competition by 2028 at the earliest. The Darwin based Indigenous All-Stars have participated in the AFL pre-season competition. In 2003, a record crowd of 17,500 attended a pre-season game between the All-Stars and Carlton Football Club at Marrara.

Rugby League and Rugby Union club competitions are played in Darwin each year, organised by the NTRL and NTRU respectively. The Darwin Hottest Sevens in the World tournament is hosted in Darwin each January, with Rugby Sevens club teams from countries including Australia, New Zealand, Papua New Guinea, Malaysia, and Singapore competing. Darwin's Hottest 7s is the richest Rugby 7s tournament in the Southern Hemisphere.

Darwin hosts a round of the Supercars Championship every year, bringing thousands of motorsports fans to the Hidden Valley Raceway. Also in Hidden Valley, adjacent to the road-racing circuit, is Darwin's dirt track racing venue, Northline Speedway. The speedway has hosted a number of Australian Championships over the years for different categories including Sprintcars, Speedcars, and Super Sedans.

The Darwin Cup culminating on the first Monday of August is a popular horse race event for Darwin and draws large crowds every year to Fannie Bay Racecourse. While it is not as popular as the Melbourne Cup, it does draw a crowd and, in 2003, Sky Racing began televising most of the races. The Darwin Cup day is a public holiday for the Northern Territory (Picnic Day public holiday).

There is one greyhound racing track in Darwin at Winnellie Park on Hook Road. It is the only track in the Northern Territory.

In 2022, the Darwin Salties basketball club will debut in the Queensland-based NBL1 North competition, making the NBL1 the first Australian sport league to have clubs based in and playing out of every state and territory in Australia.

Media 

Darwin's major newspapers are the Northern Territory News (Monday–Saturday), The Sunday Territorian (Sunday), and the national daily, The Australian (Monday–Friday) and The Weekend Australian (Saturday), all published by News Corp. Free weekly community newspapers include Sun Newspapers (delivered in Darwin, Palmerston and Litchfield), and published by the NT News. Another newspaper, the Centralian Advocate (1947–present), is printed in Darwin and trucked to Alice Springs.

Former publications in (or connected to) Darwin include:
Moonta Herald and Northern Territory Gazette (1869)
Northern Territory Times and Gazette (1873–1927)
The North Australian (1883–1889)
The North Australian and Northern Territory Government Gazette (1889–1890)
The Northern Territory Times (1927–1932)
The Northern Standard (c.1929–1942)
Army News (1941–1946) – for the troops stationed in Darwin
The Darwin Sun (1981–1982) – a community newsletter

Five free-to-air channels service Darwin. Commercial television channels are provided by Seven Darwin (Seven Network affiliate), Nine Darwin (formerly branded as Channel 8) and Ten Darwin (Network Ten relay), which launched on 28 April 2008. The two government-owned national broadcast services in Darwin are the ABC and SBS. Subscription television services Foxtel via Cable and Fetch TV via IPTV are available in the Darwin/Palmerston/Litchfield areas.

Darwin has radio stations on AM and FM frequencies, as well as on DAB+ (digital radio). ABC stations include ABC Local Radio (105.7FM), ABC Radio National (657AM), ABC News Radio (102.5FM), ABC Classic (107.3FM) and Triple J (103.3FM). SBS Radio (100.9FM) also broadcasts its national radio network to Darwin. There are three commercial radio stations, Hot 100, Mix 104.9 and Top Country 92.3. Other stations in Darwin include university-based station Territory FM 104.1, dance music station KIK FM 91.5, Palmerston FM 88.0 and Niche Radio 87.6  Non-English stations include Arabic-language channel 2ME 1638AM, Chinese-language channel 3CW 1701AM, Greek-language channel 2MM 1656AM, Italian-language channel Rete Italia 1476AM and Spanish-language channel Radio Austral 90.7FM. Indigenous community-based stations Radio Larrakia 94.5FM and Radio Yolngu 1530AM. The two sports stations TAB Radio 1242AM and SEN 1611AM. As well as Christian stations Faith 88.4FM, Rhema 97.7FM and Vision Radio 1323AM.

Transport 

The Territory's public transport services are managed by the Department of Lands and Planning, Public Transport Division. Darwin has a bus network serviced by a range of contracted bus operators, which provides transport to the main suburbs of Darwin.

Darwin has no commuter rail system; however, long-distance passenger rail services do operate out of the city. The Alice Springs-to-Darwin rail line was completed in 2003, linking Darwin to Adelaide. The first service ran in 2004. The Ghan passenger train service from Adelaide via Alice Springs and Katherine runs once per week in each direction, with some exceptions.

Darwin International Airport, in the suburb of Eaton, is Darwin's only airport, which shares its runways with the Royal Australian Air Force's RAAF Base Darwin.

Darwin can be reached via the Stuart Highway, which runs the length of the Northern Territory from Darwin through Katherine, Tennant Creek, Alice Springs, and on to Adelaide. Other major roads in Darwin include, Tiger Brennan Drive, Amy Johnson Avenue, Dick Ward Drive, Bagot Road, Trower Road, and McMillans Road. Bus service in the greater Darwin area is provided by Darwinbus.

Port

Ferries leave from Port Darwin to island locations, mainly for tourists. A ferry service to the Tiwi Islands, the Arafura Pearl, operates from Cullen Bay.

Darwin has a deepwater port, East Arm Wharf, which opened in 2000.

Infrastructure

Health 
The Government of the Northern Territory Department of Health and Families oversees one public hospital in the Darwin metropolitan region. The Royal Darwin Hospital, in Tiwi, is the city's major teaching and referral hospital, and the largest in the Northern Territory.

There is one major private hospital, Darwin Private Hospital, in Tiwi, adjacent to the Royal Darwin Hospital. Darwin Private Hospital is operated and owned by Healthscope Ltd, a private hospital corporation.

A new hospital called Palmerston Regional Hospital was opened in August 2018 to help ease the pressure of patient numbers at the Royal Darwin Hospital.

Utilities 
Water storage, supply and Power for Darwin is managed by Power and Water Corporation, which is owned by the Government of the Northern Territory. The corporation is also responsible for management of sewage and the major water catchments in the region. Water is mainly stored in the largest dam, The Darwin River Dam, which holds up to 90% of Darwin's water supply. For many years, Darwin's principal water supply came from Manton Dam.

Darwin and its suburbs, Palmerston and Katherine, are powered by the Channel Island Power Station, the largest power plant in the Northern Territory, and the Weddell Power Station.

Telecommunications 
Darwin previously had Australia's only international connection to the outside world in the form of an overseas telegraph cable, connecting Darwin to Java.  The southern section of the cable connected Darwin with Adelaide and was known as the overland telegraph line. In 2022 it was announced by the Northern Territory Government that an international undersea cable system would land into Darwin directly connecting the city to Indonesia, Singapore the United States and Timor Leste. The new cable system representing an investment of $700m is expected to create a new digital economy as it is coupled with recent announcements on Data Centre Investment into Darwin. The plans for Darwin for Data Centres and International cables are outlined in the Northern Territory's Digital Strategy the Terabit Territory.

See also 

 List of films shot in Darwin
 List of mayors and lord mayors of Darwin
 List of people from Darwin
 Local government areas of the Northern Territory

Notes

References

External links 
City of Darwin Official Website
Darwin – Tourism Australia
NT Street and Place Names search
Surveying Darwin, Northern Territory Library online feature 
 Connecting Darwin to Asia and the United States
 Australian Subsea Start-up To Build Transpacific Cable into Darwin
 DCI Data Centres to build facility in Darwin
 NEXTDC to develop Darwin's first world-class data centre in partnership with the Northern Territory Government

 
Australian capital cities
Cities in the Northern Territory
Coastal cities in Australia
Port cities in the Northern Territory
Timor Sea
Populated places established in 1869
1869 establishments in Australia
Tourist attractions in the Northern Territory
World War II sites in Australia
1869 establishments in Oceania